was a Japanese television special about an elderly man who runs an old haberdashery in Kure.  The drama, produced by NHK Hiroshima in 2008 for their 80th anniversary, won the valuable TV drama award at the 63rd Japan Agency for Cultural Affairs Art Festival.

Plot
In the port city of Kure, there is an old hat shop.  Shunpei, the elderly shop owner, is proud of his career as a skillful hatter, with famous clients such as fleet admiral Isoroku Yamamoto.  However, as time goes on, the number of orders decreases and his memory begins to fail him.  Shunpei occasionally has to ask his security guard, Goro, to help him find his scissors.

One day, Shunpei discovers his childhood friend, Setsu, is Goro's mother.  She left Goro due to an issue with her husband, and now she is in the end stages of cancer. Setsu had been physically weak since childhood, due to radiation exposure from the atomic bombing of Hiroshima in 1945.  Shunpei had thought of Setsu as a sister, but he couldn't ask her to live with him in Kure, so she left to earn a living in Hiroshima.  He missed her ever since.

Shunpei decides to reunite Goro with his mother. Shunpei knows that Setsu has been living in Tokyo, suffering discrimination as a radiation exposure victim.  But when Shunpei finds Setsu, she seems to be living quite happily. Setsu still has a small sailor hat which Shunpei made for her years ago, and which always cheers her up in the face of hardship.  Setsu showed the hat to Shunpei, to encourage him and renew his pride. Upon seeing the hat, Shunpei's mind is restored and his forgetfulness disappears.

Cast
 Ken Ogata as "Shunpei Takayama", an older gentleman living alone in port city Kure as a hatter.
 Yukihide Kasahara as 28-year-old "Shunpei", working hard, helping Setsu, and loves her.
 Hayami Takahashi as 6-year-old "Shunpei", likes his father.
 Yūko Tanaka as "Setsu Takemoto", an older lady living in Tokyo with her family, Shunpei's childhood friend, Goro's real mother.
 Aki Asakura as 19-year-old "Setsu", in delicate health, loves Shunpei.
 Tetsuji Tamayama as "Goro Kawahara", Shunpei's security agent and Setsu's son.
 Ittoku Kishibe as "Masayuki Kawahara", Goro's father and Setsu's ex-husband, a doctor and runs his hospital in Hiroshima.
 Maho Tomita as "Yu Takayama", Shunpei's granddaughter living in Tokyo.
 Hiromi Yuki as "Mikazu Kawahara", Goro's stepmother and Masayuki's wife.
 Erika Kobayashi as "Aki Kawahara", Goro's stepsister.
 Toshiyuki Kitami as "Katsuto Takemoto", Setsu's husband, runs his laundry with her.
 Asae Onishi as "Haruko Takemoto", Setsu's daughter.
 Gan Iwata as a chief "Todoroki", Goro's boss.
 Teizo Muta as "Fukuzo", Shunpei's friend.
 Takayuki Moriwaki as Fukuzo's grandchild.
 Shin'ya Yamamoto (actor) as "Futoyama", principal of Kure Sanjyo junior high school, will order student caps to Shunpei.
 Ryuji Yamamoto as "Ichimura", a chairman of the PTA of Sanjyo junior high school.
 Mitsuomi Aono as general "Isoroku Yamamoto",
 Katsuaki Takahashi as "Reikichi Takayama", Shunpei's father made the cap for Isoroku Yamamoto.

Theme song
The theme song is titled Inochi no Uta / (Songs can change the world) and was written for NHK's 80th anniversary.  The lyrics invite the public to join the song to collect their messages of life and peace.

 Sora ni Saku Hana / (Flowers bloom in the sky)
 Sung by Chitose Hajime
 Written by Yoko Maruyama (selected from 1,904 submissions)
 Supported by HUSSY R
 Composed by Yuichi Tajika and Yoshinobu Morikawa
 Arranged by Takumi Mamiya

The Inochi no Uta Project continued in 2009.

See also
Japanese television programs
 Kure was the home port of the battleship Yamato, and there was the largest naval port in Asia.

References

External links
 Bōshi - NHK Hiroshima official
 Bōshi - Cast - NHK Hiroshima official
 Bōshi - Theme song "Sorani Saku Hana - NHK Hiroshima official
 Bōshi - Album - NHK Hiroshima official
 Bōshi - Album - Hiroshima Film Commission
 Bōshi - Studio sets - Hiroshima Film Commission
 NHK Drama News 2008
 Bōshi - Film shooting locations in Kure
 Sora ni Saku Hana on Inochi no Uta Concert

2008 television films
2008 films
Japanese television films
Japanese drama television series
Japanese television specials
Television shows about the atomic bombings of Hiroshima and Nagasaki
Films set in Kure
Films shot in Kure
Films set in Hiroshima
Films shot in Hiroshima
Films set in Tokyo
Films shot in Tokyo